Adis Nurković (born 28 April 1986) is a Bosnian-born naturalized Kosovan professional footballer who plays as a goalkeeper and also is goalkeeping coach of Bosnian club Čelik Zenica.

Club career

Flamurtari Vlorë
Nurković was born to a Bosnian Muslim family in the Bosnian town of Velika Kladuša on 28 April 1986. On 15 June 2017, Nurković joined Albanian Superliga side Flamurtari Vlorë, to replace the departed Stivi Frashëri as the second choice. On 9 September 2017, he made his debut in a 2–0 away defeat against Skënderbeu Korçë after being named in the starting line-up.

Tuzla City
On 7 June 2018, Nurković joined with the newly promoted team of Bosnian Premier League side Tuzla City. On 24 November 2018, he made his debut in a 1–2 home defeat against Zrinjski Mostar after being named in the starting line-up. After a year with Tuzla City, it was confirmed that Nurković had left the club.

Return to Čelik Zenica
On 18 June 2019, Nurković returned to Bosnian side Čelik Zenica, on a three-year contract.

International career

Bosnia and Herzegovina

Under-21
On 6 September 2008, Nurković made his debut with Bosnia and Herzegovina U21 in a 2009 UEFA European Under-21 Championship qualification match against Romania U21 after being named in the starting line-up.

Senior
On 12 August 2009, Nurković made his debut with Bosnia and Herzegovina in a friendly match against Iran after coming on as a substitute at 62nd minute in place of Nemanja Supić.

Kosovo
Nurković was invited by the coach Albert Bunjaki to play for Kosovo national team based on Bunjaki's satisfactory impression of Nurković at Travnik. As he is married to a Kosovan citizen, he is eligible for Kosovo citizenship and FIFA's rules allow Nurković to play for any national side resulting from the break-up of SFR Yugoslavia as he was born during the country's existence.

On 2 October 2016, Nurković received a call-up from Kosovo for a 2018 FIFA World Cup qualification matches against Croatia and Ukraine. On 5 October 2016, FIFA gave him permission to play for Kosovo. On 11 June 2017, Nurković made his debut with Kosovo in a 2018 FIFA World Cup qualification against Turkey after coming on as a substitute at 53rd minute in place of injured Samir Ujkani.

Coaching career
On 16 July 2020, three days after Bosnian club Čelik Zenica was excluded to the League of Zenica-Doboj Canton because of financial difficulties, it was announced that Nurković was to stay in the club both as a player and goalkeeping coach.

Career statistics

Club

International

References

External links

1986 births
Living people
People from Velika Kladuša
Kosovan people of Bosniak descent
Kosovan people of Bosnia and Herzegovina descent
People with acquired Kosovan citizenship
Naturalised citizens of Kosovo
Association football goalkeepers
Kosovan footballers
Kosovo international footballers
Bosnia and Herzegovina footballers
Bosnia and Herzegovina youth international footballers
Bosnia and Herzegovina under-21 international footballers
Bosnia and Herzegovina international footballers
Dual internationalists (football)
NK Jedinstvo Bihać players
FK Krajina Cazin players
HNK Cibalia players
NK Travnik players
NK Slaven Belupo players
NK Čelik Zenica players
Flamurtari Vlorë players
FK Tuzla City players
Premier League of Bosnia and Herzegovina players
Croatian Football League players
Kategoria Superiore players
Bosnia and Herzegovina expatriate footballers
Kosovan expatriate footballers
Expatriate footballers in Croatia
Bosnia and Herzegovina expatriate sportspeople in Croatia
Kosovan expatriate sportspeople in Croatia
Expatriate footballers in Albania
Kosovan expatriate sportspeople in Albania
Bosnia and Herzegovina expatriate sportspeople in Albania